The Bacolod Arts and Youth Sports Center (BAYS Center) is a multi-use gym located in Bacolod, fronting the Bacolod Public Plaza, in Negros Occidental, Philippines. It is used mostly for basketball, karatedo and boxing matches, and was used in events in the city like the MassKara Festival activities and other government related activities like seminars, business and political gatherings.

It was the venue of the UMA-ONEBA and NOKAF Championships in which the Western Visayas athletes participated in sporting events.

The gym has a seating capacity of more than a thousand. It is officially designated as the COMELEC tally headquarters for both local and national election in the Philippines.

Aside from the gym, it also serves as offices of the departments of the city and also serves as cultural facilities.

External links
Bacolod City official website

See also
Bacolod
NOMPAC
La Salle Coliseum
Bacolod City Arena

References

Athletics (track and field) venues in the Philippines
Indoor arenas in the Philippines
Buildings and structures in Bacolod
Sports in Negros Occidental